Parviz Azadov (born on 19 October 2000) is an Azerbaijani professional footballer who plays as a midfielder for Zira in the Azerbaijan Premier League.

Club career
On 31 August 2019, Azadov made his debut in the Azerbaijan Premier League for Keşla match against Gabala.

References

External links
 

2000 births
Living people
Association football midfielders
Azerbaijani footballers
Azerbaijan Premier League players
Shamakhi FK players